Oncideres fulvostillata is a species of beetle in the family Cerambycidae. It was described by Henry Walter Bates in 1872. It is known from Mexico, Panama, Nicaragua, and Costa Rica.

References

fulvostillata
Beetles described in 1872